The 2009 Formula 3 Euro Series season was the seventh championship year of the Formula 3 Euro Series. The series consisted of ten double-header meetings beginning at Hockenheim on 16 May and ending at the same venue on 25 October. Jules Bianchi claimed the title for ART Grand Prix, winning his eighth race of the season at Dijon-Prenois.

Drivers and teams

Driver changes
Changed Teams
 Sam Bird: Manor Motorsport → Mücke Motorsport
 Tom Dillmann: SG Formula → HBR Motorsport
 Mika Mäki: Mücke Motorsport → Signature-Plus
 Edoardo Mortara: Signature-Plus → Kolles & Heinz Union
 Basil Shaaban: HBR Motorsport → Prema Powerteam
 Robert Wickens: Signature-Plus → Kolles & Heinz Union
 Renger van der Zande: Prema Powerteam → (Motopark Academy)

Entering/Re-Entering Formula 3 Euro Series
 Mirko Bortolotti: Italian Formula Three Championship (Lucidi Motors) → Carlin Motorsport
 Valtteri Bottas: Formula Renault 2.0 Northern European Cup & Eurocup Formula Renault 2.0 (Motopark Academy) → ART Grand Prix
 Andrea Caldarelli: Formula Renault 2.0 West European Cup & Eurocup Formula Renault 2.0 (SG Formula) → SG Formula
 Johnny Cecotto Jr.:  German Formula Three Championship (HS Technik Motorsport) → HBR Motorsport
 Matteo Chinosi: German Formula Three Championship (Ombra Racing) → Prema Powerteam
 Carlo van Dam: All-Japan Formula Three Championship (Petronas Team Tom's) → Manor Motorsport
 Pedro Enrique: Formula Three Sudamericana (Cesário Fórmula) → Manor Motorsport
 Víctor García Spanish Formula Three Championship (Escuderia TEC-Auto & RP Motorsport) → Prema Powerteam
 Tiago Geronimi: Formula BMW Europe (Eifelland Racing) → Signature-Plus
 Esteban Gutiérrez: Formula BMW Europe (Josef Kaufmann Racing) → ART Grand Prix
 Johan Jokinen: Formula Renault 2.0 Northern European Cup (Motopark Academy) → Kolles & Heinz Union
 Alexandre Marsoin: Formula Renault 3.5 Series (Epsilon Euskadi) → SG Formula
 Roberto Merhi: Formula Renault 2.0 West European Cup & Eurocup Formula Renault 2.0 (Epsilon Euskadi) → Manor Motorsport
 Kevin Mirocha: German Formula Three Championship (Josef Kaufmann Racing) → HBR Motorsport
 Nico Monien: ADAC Formel Masters (URD Rennsport) → Mücke Motorsport
 Atte Mustonen: British Formula 3 Championship (Räikkönen Robertson Racing) → Motopark Academy
 César Ramos: Italian Formula Renault Championship & Eurocup Formula Renault 2.0 (BVM Minardi Team) → Manor Motorsport
 Jake Rosenzweig: Formula Renault 2.0 West European Cup & Eurocup Formula Renault 2.0 (Epsilon Euskadi) → Carlin Motorsport
 Tim Sandtler: International Formula Master (Team ISR) → Prema Powerteam
 Alexander Sims: British Formula Renault Championship (Manor Competition) → Mücke Motorsport
 Adrien Tambay: Formula BMW Europe (Eifelland Racing) → ART Grand Prix
 Nick Tandy: British Formula 3 Championship (JTR with Marshall Westland) → Kolles & Heinz Union
 Marco Wittmann: Formula BMW Europe (Josef Kaufmann Racing) → Mücke Motorsport
 Christopher Zanella: Swiss Formula Renault Championship (Jenzer Motorsport) → Motopark Academy

Leaving Formula 3 Euro Series
 Niall Breen: Manor Motorsport → Sabbatical
 Daniel Campos-Hull: HBR Motorsport → Italian Formula Three Championship (Prema Powerteam)
 Yann Clairay: SG Formula → Le Mans Series (Luc Alphand Aventures)
 Cong Fu Cheng: RC Motorsport → A1 Grand Prix (A1 Team China)
 Dani Clos: Prema Powerteam → GP2 Series (Fat Burner Racing Engineering)
 Peter Elkmann: RC Motorsport → German Formula Three Championship (Performance Racing)
 Rodolfo González: Carlin Motorsport → Euroseries 3000 (Fisichella Motor Sport)
 Maximilian Götz: RC Motorsport → Lamborghini Blancpain Super Trofeo – Pro (Lamborghini München Team Holzer)
 Nico Hülkenberg: ART Grand Prix → GP2 Series (ART Grand Prix)
 James Jakes: ART Grand Prix → GP2 Asia Series (Super Nova Racing)
 Erik Janiš: Mücke Motorsport → International Formula Master (ISR Racing)
 Charlie Kimball: Prema Powerteam → Firestone Indy Lights (Team PBIR)
 Michael Klein: Jo Zeller Racing → Retirement
 Jens Klingmann: RC Motorsport →  FIA GT3 European Championship (Alpina)
 Jon Lancaster: ART Grand Prix → Formula Renault 3.5 Series (Comtec Racing)
 Franck Mailleux: Signature-Plus → Le Mans Series (Signature-Plus)
 Oliver Oakes: Carlin Motorsport → British Formula 3 Championship (Carlin Motorsport)
 Kazuya Oshima: Manor Motorsport → Formula Nippon (Petronas Team TOM'S) & Super GT (Lexus Team Kraft)
 Nelson Panciatici:  RC Motorsport → GP2 Series (Durango)
 Richard Philippe: Carlin Motorsport → Firestone Indy Lights (Genoa Racing)
 Martin Plowman: RC Motorsport → Firestone Indy Lights (Panther Racing)
 Daniel Ricciardo: SG Formula → British Formula 3 Championship (Carlin Motorsport)
 Koudai Tsukakoshi: Manor Motorsport → Formula Nippon (HFDP Racing) & Super GT (Keihin Real Racing)
 Frédéric Vervisch: RC Motorsport → Atlantic Championship (Genoa Racing)

Calendar

Season standings

Drivers Standings
Points are awarded as follows:

† — Drivers did not finish the race, but were classified as they completed over 90% of the race distance.

 Pole-winners in bold; race 1 pole-winners earn one point, except at Brands Hatch.
 Drivers achieving fastest lap in italics. No points awarded.
 1 – Stefano Coletti was disqualified from the first race at the Norisring, due to a post-race altercation with Jules Bianchi. Coletti was excluded from the meeting, and no driver was awarded third place points.

Team Standings

Nations Cup

See also
 2009 Masters of Formula 3
 2009 Macau Grand Prix Formula Three

Notes

References

External links
The official website of the Formula 3 Euro Series

Formula 3 Euro Series seasons
Euro Series
Formula 3 Euro Series